Norbeck may refer to:

Norbeck, Maryland
Norbeck, South Dakota
Joakim Norbeck, a Swedish scientist
Peter Norbeck, a politician from South Dakota